William Owens John Norton (1820 – 25 April 1873) was an English cricketer who played in three first-class cricket matches for Kent County Cricket Club between 1853 and 1859. He played once for Kent against Surrey in 1853 and twice against MCC in 1859, as well as playing regularly in other matches for a variety of sides.

Norton was born at Aylesford in Kent in 1820 and was a nephew of Alfred Mynn, a significant figure in Kent cricket during the 1840s. Three cousins, Bradbury Norton, Selby Norton and William South Norton also played for Kent, the latter captaining the side between 1856 and 1870. He died in Lambeth in 1873 aged 53.

References

External links

1820 births
1873 deaths
English cricketers
Kent cricketers
People from Aylesford